Xyroptila kuranda is a moth of the family Pterophoridae. It is found in southern Sulawesi and Australia.

References

External links

Moths described in 2006
Moths of Australia
Moths of Indonesia
kuranda